Abolghasem Sarhaddizadeh (– July 14, 2020) was an Iranian reformist politician who served as a member of the Parliament of Iran for three terms representing Tehran, Rey, Shemiranat and Eslamshahr. Sarhaddizadeh also served as Minister of Labour and Social Affairs from 1983 to 1989.

References

1945 births
2020 deaths
Government ministers of Iran
Members of the 3rd Islamic Consultative Assembly
Members of the 5th Islamic Consultative Assembly
Members of the 6th Islamic Consultative Assembly
Islamic Labour Party politicians
Worker House members
Central Council of the Islamic Republican Party members
Secretaries-General of political parties in Iran
Deaths from the COVID-19 pandemic in Iran